The 1991 Brantford municipal election was held on November 12, 1991, to elect a mayor, councillors, and school trustees in Brantford, Ontario, Canada.

Bob Taylor, who had served on council for only one year, was elected as mayor over incumbent Karen George.

Results

Patrick "Pat" Luciani is a businessperson in Brantford. He was elected to Brantford city council for the city's third ward in 1972 and 1974; this followed two unsuccessful bids in 1968 and 1970. He did not seek re-election in 1976. After a nine-year break, he was returned to council in 1985, winning a seat in the city's fifth ward. Luciani first ran for mayor of Brantford in the 1988 municipal election and finished a distant second against incumbent Karen George. He described his second loss in 1991 as "disappointing," adding that the protest vote did not break as he expected. In 1996, Luciani led a group of Brantford businesspersons in proposing a private university named after Alexander Graham Bell, targeted to overseas enrollment. The project never came to fruition. He was more successful in bringing back the Italian Village to Brantford's International Villages Festival in 2008, and he also helped organize local relief efforts following the 2009 L'Aquila earthquake.

Enid Green ran unsuccessfully for the Brantford City Council in 1978, 1980, 1982, and 1985. She briefly served as a member of council in 1982, when she was appointed to replace deceased council member Charles Ward. She has also been an executive member of the Business and Professional Women's Club of Brant. She ran for a seat on the board of education in 1991, without success. In 2000, Green recommended that profits from the Brantford Charity Casino be directed toward subsidizing bus passes for low-income individuals.

References

1991 elections in Canada
1991
1991 in Ontario